Yuji Yaku (born 3 January 1961) is a Japanese bobsledder. He competed at the 1984 Winter Olympics and the 1988 Winter Olympics.

References

1961 births
Living people
Japanese male bobsledders
Olympic bobsledders of Japan
Bobsledders at the 1984 Winter Olympics
Bobsledders at the 1988 Winter Olympics
Sportspeople from Gunma Prefecture